Colletotrichum destructivum is a plant pathogen.

References

External links

destructivum
Fungal plant pathogens and diseases
Soybean diseases
Fungi described in 1915